The Latvian Museum in Rockville, Maryland has as its mission the preservation and communication of Latvian history and culture and the history of Latvians in the United States. The Museum is housed in facilities that include the national headquarters of the American Latvian Association as well as the Latvian Evangelical Lutheran church and Latvian Saturday school which serve the Latvian American community in the greater Washington D.C. area.

History
The Latvian  Museum was founded in 1978 under the auspices of the Latvian Institute of the American Latvian Association, with its initial exhibitions funded by a grant from the National Endowment for the Humanities.

Collection
The collection is especially noted for its traditional hand woven textiles.

External links 
 The American Latvian Association — Museums

1978 establishments in Maryland
Ethnic museums in Maryland
European-American museums
History museums in Maryland
Latvian-American culture in Maryland
Latvian-American history
Museums in Montgomery County, Maryland
Rockville, Maryland
Museums established in 1978